Louis Maes (born 6 February 1913, date of death unknown) was a Belgian canoeist who competed in the 1936 Summer Olympics.

In 1936 he finished 11th in the K-1 10000 m event.

References
Sports-reference.com profile

1913 births
Belgian male canoeists
Canoeists at the 1936 Summer Olympics
Olympic canoeists of Belgium
Year of death missing